Anna Bøe (1 May 1864 – 23 April 1956) was a Norwegian journalist, co-founder and editor of the women's magazine Urd for 37 years.

Personal life
Bøe was born in Aker (now Oslo) to Hans Simonsen Bøe and Marie Ringstad. She died in Asker in 1956, nearly 92 years old.

Career

Bøe founded the women's magazine Urd in 1897, along with her sister Cecilie, and served as the magazine's editor from the start until 1933. The profile of Urd was culture, art, popular education and women's rights, with a basically Christian life stance.

Her literary works include the feuilleton novel Idealer, as well as poetry. She took part in the contemporary debate by writing newspaper articles on culture and other issues. She also edited  for four years.

References

1864 births
1956 deaths
Journalists from Oslo
Norwegian magazine editors
Norwegian women editors
Norwegian women journalists
Norwegian women writers
Women magazine editors